Mirza Begić (born 9 July 1985) is a retired Bosnian-born Slovenian professional basketball player. The  center, he represented the Slovenian national team in the international competitions.

Professional career

Early years
Begić began his career playing with Sloboda Dita Tuzla in Bosnia and Herzegovina. He made his professional debut with Sloboda in the Bosnia and Herzegovina League during the 2001–02 season.

He then arrived to Slovenia in 2002, and stayed in KK Koper for 2 months. In the 2002–03 season, he played for Union Olimpija's junior team. Then he moved to Triglav Kranj in the Slovenian League. Begić averaged 7 points, 5 rebounds, and 1.7 blocks, in 16.9 minutes in his first season in the Slovenian League in 2003–04.

In 2004, Begić signed with the Italian League club Virtus Bologna. In his first season with the club he was loaned to Huy Basket in Belgium's First Division. He averaged 6.3 points and 4.2 rebounds per game. In the 2005-06 season, he was released by Virtus Bologna.

In the 2006–07 season, Begić moved back to Slovenia. He signed with Geoplin Slovan. He averaged 9.8 points, 6.0 rebounds, and 1.9 blocks in 22.2 minutes per game in the Adriatic League, and 9.3 points, 5.7 rebounds, and 1.5 blocks per game in the Slovenian League.

Union Olimpija
On 30 July 2007 Begić signed a 2-year contract with Union Olimpija. He made his Euroleague debut on 24 October 2007 versus the Italian League club Montepaschi Siena. Begić averaged 3.6 points and 2.8 rebounds per game in his first season of the Euroleague play. In his second season in Euroleague, he averaged career-high 11.1 points and 6.1 rebounds per game.

In his second season in the Adriatic League, he averaged 3.9 points and 3.5 rebounds per game. He played in the 2008 Adriatic League Final Four in Ljubljana, where his team, Union Olimpija, lost in the semifinals against Partizan Belgrade. In his third season in the Adriatic League, he finished with averages of 8.9 points and 4.5 rebounds per game. He won the Slovenian National Championship and Slovenian Cup with Union Olimpija in 2008 and 2009. On 24 November 2008 he renewed his contract through the end of the 2010–11 season.

Real Madrid
On 18 January 2011 Begić reached an agreement with the Spanish League club Real Madrid to play for the club until the end of the 2012–13 season. The 2012–13 season was successful for Begić in Real Madrid, reaching the Euroleague final and winning the Spanish League.

2013–2020
On 20 July 2013 Begić signed a two year-contract with the back-to-back defending Euroleague champions Olympiacos of the Greek League. He left Olympiacos after one season.

On 20 September 2014 Begić signed a one-year deal with his former team Union Olimpija. On 19 November 2014 he left Olimpija and signed a one-month deal with Laboral Kutxa Baskonia. On 24 December 2014 he extended his contract with Laboral Kutxa Baskonia for the rest of the season.

On 14 October 2015 Begić signed with the New Orleans Pelicans, only to be waived by the team two days later. On 7 December 2015 Begić signed with Spanish club Dominion Bilbao Basket for the rest of the season.

On 27 July 2016 Begić signed with Croatian club Cedevita Zagreb for the 2016–17 season.

On 13 August 2017 Begić signed with Petrochimi Bandar Imam of the Iranian Basketball Super League. On 17 January 2018 he returned to Olimpija.

On 15 July 2019 he signed with Mornar Bar. On 8 February 2020 he parted ways with Mornar averaging 3.6 points and 1.6 rebounds in 14 games of ABA League.

On 21 September 2020 he decided to retire from professional basketball.

Career statistics

Euroleague

|-
| style="text-align:left;"| 2007–08
| style="text-align:left;"| Union Olimpija
| 9 || 7 || 12.0 || .542 || .000 || .375 || 2.8 || .2 || .7 || 1.0 || 3.6 || 3.3
|-
| style="text-align:left;"| 2008–09
| style="text-align:left;"| Union Olimpija
| 10 || 9 || 22.1 || .525 || .000 || .692 || 6.1 || .3 || .6 || 1.7 || 11.1 || 14.6
|-
| style="text-align:left;"| 2009–10
| style="text-align:left;"| Žalgiris
| 16 || 12 || 19.8 || .592 || .000 || .718 || 4.0 || .5 || .5 || 1.3 || 7.4 || 8.8
|-
| style="text-align:left;"| 2010–11
| style="text-align:left;"| Real Madrid
| 16 || 3 || 15.5 || .595 || .000 || .714 || 3.3 || .3 || .4 || style="background:#CFECEC;"|1.5 || 7.4 || 8.3
|-
| style="text-align:left;"| 2011–12
| style="text-align:left;"| Real Madrid
| 15 || 4 || 14.2 || .545 || .000 || .643 || 4.7 || .4 || .1 || 1.7 || 4.6 || 7.5
|-
| style="text-align:left;"| 2012–13
| style="text-align:left;"| Real Madrid
| 29 || 23 || 12.8 || .614 || .000 || .614 || 3.4 || .3 || .2 || .9 || 5.0 || 5.5
|-
| style="text-align:left;"| 2013–14
| style="text-align:left;"| Olympiacos
| 12 || 3 || 8.4 || .543 || .000 || .625 || 2.0 || .2 || .1 || .8 || 3.6 || 4.3
|-
| style="text-align:left;"| 2014–15
| style="text-align:left;"| Baskonia
| 18 || 3 || 17.3 || .556 || .000 || .705 || 4.3 || .4 || .4 || 1.7 || 6.8 || 10.2
|- class="sortbottom"
| style="text-align:left;"| Career
| style="text-align:left;"|
| 125 || 66 || 15.1 || .554 || .000 || .665 || 3.8 || .3 || .3 || 1.3 || 6.1 || 7.6

Slovenian national team
Begić was a member of the Slovenian under-20 national team. He competed at the 2005 FIBA Europe Under-20 Championship in Russia, which he led in blocked shots per game. He has also been a member of the senior men's Slovenian national basketball team. He played at the EuroBasket 2011, which he also led in blocked shots per game.

Personal life
Begić was born in Bijeljina, SR Bosnia and Herzegovina, Yugoslavia. He lived in his native Bosnia and Herzegovina until 2002, when he moved to Slovenia and subsequently took Slovenian citizenship.

References

External links

 Mirza Begić at aba-liga.com
 Mirza Begić at acb.com
 Mirza Begić at draftexpress.com
 Mirza Begić at eurobasket.com
 Mirza Begić at euroleague.net
 Mirza Begić at FIBA.com
 

1985 births
Living people
ABA League players
BC Žalgiris players
Bilbao Basket players
Bosnia and Herzegovina emigrants to Slovenia
Bosnia and Herzegovina expatriate basketball people in Greece
Bosnia and Herzegovina expatriate basketball people in Spain
Bosnia and Herzegovina men's basketball players
Bosniaks of Bosnia and Herzegovina
Centers (basketball)
Bosnia and Herzegovina expatriate basketball people in Iran
Bosnia and Herzegovina expatriate basketball people in Lithuania
KD Slovan players
KK Cedevita players
KK Olimpija players
KK Sloboda Tuzla players
Liga ACB players
Olympiacos B.C. players
People from Bijeljina
Petrochimi Bandar Imam BC players
Real Madrid Baloncesto players
Saski Baskonia players
Slovenian expatriate basketball people in Greece
Slovenian expatriate basketball people in Spain
Slovenian men's basketball players
Slovenian expatriate basketball people in Iran
Slovenian people of Bosniak descent
Slovenian expatriate basketball people in Lithuania
Bosnia and Herzegovina expatriate basketball people in Belgium
Slovenian expatriate basketball people in Belgium
Bosnia and Herzegovina expatriate basketball people in Italy
Slovenian expatriate basketball people in Italy